Hundred Acres is the third studio album by American musician S. Carey. It was released in February 2018 under Jagjaguwar.

Track listing

Charts

References

2018 albums
S. Carey albums
Jagjaguwar albums